RMIT's Graduate School of Business and Law is an Australian graduate school within the College of Business at the Royal Melbourne Institute of Technology (RMIT University), located in Melbourne, Victoria.

Location
The school is located in the heritage-listed Neoclassical building of the former Emily McPherson College of Domestic Economy (which amalgamated with RMIT in 1979). The building underwent a A$23.2 million renovation in 2010 to house the school.

See also
RMIT University
Emily McPherson College of Domestic Economy

References

External links
Graduate School of Business and Law

Business and Law, Graduate
Postgraduate schools in Australia
Business schools in Australia
Law schools in Australia